The Paoli Research Center was a research and development facility established in 1954  by the Burroughs Corporation, then known as the Burroughs Adding Machine Company. It was created a university campus like setting in the Philadelphia suburb of Paoli, Pennsylvania for the Burroughs Research Laboratory, then located at 511 North Broad Street in Philadelphia. The initial focus was for the development of business accounting systems and experimental work in electromechanics. The Paoli Research Center grew over the years and was the source of many research contribution to computing, including work on computing hardware design, programming languages, algorithms and defense applications.

The research center continued after Burroughs and Sperry Corporation merged to become Unisys and performed both research for the Unisys corporation as well as for government sponsors. Research topics included artificial intelligence, computational linguistics, database systems, software engineering and bioinformatics. In the 1990 the research staff was relocated to Unisys' nearby Great Valley facility  and the Paoli building was sold in 1992, demolished and replaced with condominiums and an assisted living center.

External links 
Burroughs Research Center in Paoli, Tredyffrin Easttown Historical Society
The Burroughs Research Center in Paoli

References

Computer science research organizations